The Lithuanian A Lyga 1999 was the tenth season of top-tier football in Lithuania. The season started on 5 July 1999 and ended on 6 November 1999. 10 teams participated, 3 fewer than the previous season, and Žalgiris Kaunas won the championship.

League standings

Results

Relegation play-off 

|}

References

LFF Lyga seasons
1
Lith
Lith